Howard Black was a professional baseball pitcher in the Negro leagues. He played with the Cleveland Elites and Dayton Marcos in 1926.

References

External links
 and Seamheads 

Cleveland Elites players
Dayton Marcos players
Year of birth missing
Year of death missing
Baseball pitchers